This list of prehistoric hexacorals (Scleractinia) is an attempt to create a comprehensive listing of all genera that have ever been included in the hexacorallia which are known from the fossil record. This list excludes purely vernacular terms. It includes all commonly accepted genera, but also genera that are now considered invalid, doubtful (nomina dubia), or were not formally published (nomina nuda), as well as junior synonyms of more established names, and genera that are no longer considered scleractinia.

Naming conventions and terminology
Naming conventions and terminology follow the International Code of Zoological Nomenclature. Technical terms used include:
 Junior synonym: A name which describes the same taxon as a previously published name. If two or more genera are formally designated and the type specimens are later assigned to the same genus, the first to be published (in chronological order) is the senior synonym, and all other instances are junior synonyms. Senior synonyms are generally used, except by special decision of the ICZN, but junior synonyms cannot be used again, even if deprecated. Junior synonymy is often subjective, unless the genera described were both based on the same type specimen.
Nomen nudum (Latin for "naked name"): A name that has appeared in print but has not yet been formally published by the standards of the ICZN. Nomina nuda (the plural form) are invalid, and are therefore not italicized as a proper generic name would be. If the name is later formally published, that name is no longer a nomen nudum and will be italicized on this list. Often, the formally published name will differ from any nomina nuda that describe the same specimen.
Nomen oblitum (Latin for "forgotten name"): A name that has not been used in the scientific community for more than fifty years after its original proposal.
Preoccupied name: A name that is formally published, but which has already been used for another taxon. This second use is invalid (as are all subsequent uses) and the name must be replaced. As preoccupied names are not valid generic names, they will also go unitalicized on this list.
Nomen dubium (Latin for "dubious name"): A name describing a fossil with no unique diagnostic features. As this can be an extremely subjective and controversial designation, this term is not used on this list.

A

Acaciapora
Acalepha
Acanthastrea
Acanthocyathus
Acanthogyra
Acanthophillia
Acanthophyllia
Acanthophyllum
Accurganaxon
Acdalina
Acervularia
Acidolites
Acinophyllum
Acmophyllum
Acrocyathus
Acrohelia  – junior synonym of Galaxea
Acrophyllum
Acropora
Acrosmilia
Acsaspedites
Actinacis
Actinaraea
Actinaraeopsis
Actinastaeopsis
Actinastraea
Actinocyathus
Actinophrentis
Adamanophyllum
Adaverina
Adekoheastrea
Adelocoenia
Adetopora
Adinophyllum
Adkinsella
Adradosia
Aemulophyllum
Agaricia
Agastophyllum
Agathelia
Agathiphyllia
Agetolitella
Agetolites
Aggomorphastraea
Ahrdorffia
Ainia
Akagophyllum
Akiyosiphyllum
Aknisophyllum
Alaiophyllum
Alakiria
Alinkioduncanella
Alleynia
Allocoenia
Allocoeniopsis
Alloiteaucoenia
Alloiteausmilia
Allophyllum
Allotropiophyllum
Alpinophyllia
Alpinoseris
Altaiophyllum
Altaja
Alveolites
Alveolocyathus
Alveopora
Amandaraia
Amandophyllum
Amaraphyllum
Amniopora
Ampakabastraea
Amphelia
Amphiastraea
Amphiaulastrea
Amphimeandra
Amphiphora
Amplexiphyllum
Amplexizaphrentis
Amplexocarinia
Amplexoides
Amplexus
Amsdenoides
Amygdalophyllidium
Amygdalophylloides
Amygdalophyllum
Anactolasma
Andemantastraea
Andrazella
Angeliphyllia
Angullophyllum
Angustiphyllum
Anisastraea
Anisocoenia
Anisophyllum
Ankhelasma
Annotocyathus
Anomastraea
Anomopora
Antheria
Antherolites
Antholites
Anthostylis
Antiguastrea
Antikinkaidia
Antillia
Antillocyathus
Antillophyllia
Antilloseris
Antracophyllum
Apelismilia
Aphraxonia
Aphroelasma
Aphroidophyllum
Aphrophylloides
Aphrophyllum
Aphyllum
Aplocyathus
Aplophyllia
Aplopsammia
Aplosmilia
Apocladophyllia
Aquitanastraea
Aquitanophyllia
Arachnastraea
Arachniophyllum
Arachnolasma
Arachnolasmella
Arachnophyllum
Araeopoma
Araeopora
Araiophyllum
Araiostrotion
Archaeolasmogyra
Archaeophyllia
Archaeosmilia
Archaeosmiliopsis
Archaeozaphrentis
Archohelia
Archypora
Arcocyathus
Arcoplasma
Arctangia
Arctophyllum
Areopsammia
Argutastrea
Aristophyllum
Armalites
Asarcophyllum
Aspasmophyllum
Asperophyllum
Aspidastraea
Aspidiscus
Asserculinia
Asterobillingsia
Asterodisphyllum
Asterosmilia
Asthenophyllum
Astraeofungia
Astraeomorpha
Astraeophyllum
Astrangia
Astraraea
Astreopora
Astrhelia
Astrictophyllum
Astrocerium
Astrocoenia
Astrogyra
Astroides
Asturiphyllum
Athecastraea
Atopocoenia
Aulacophyllum
Aulastraea
Aulastraeopora
Aulina
Aulocaulis
Auloclisia
Aulocystella
Aulocystis
Aulohelia
Aulokoninckophyllum
Aulophyllum
Auloporella
Aulosmilia
Aulostegites
Aulostrotion
Aulostylus
Aulozoa
Australophyllum
Avicenia
Axinura
Axiphoria
Axoclisia
Axocricophyllum
Axocyathus
Axolasma
Axolithophyllum
Axophyllum
Axosmilia
Axotrochus
Axuolites

B
Baikitolites
Bainbridgia
Baitalites
Bajgolia
Baksanophyllia
Balanophyllia
Bantamia
Barbarella
Barrandeophyllum
Baryhelia
Barylasma
Baryphyllia
Baryphyllum
Barysmilia
Barytichisma
Basleophyllum
Bassius
Batangophyllum
Bathmosmilia
Bathybalva
Bathycoenia
Bathycyathus
Bayhaium
Beaumontia
Beiliupora
Belgradeophyllum
Beneckastraea
Bensonastraea
Benxiphyllum
Beogradophyllum
Berkhia
Bethanyphyllum
Beugniesastraea
Bibucia
Bifossularia
Bighornia
Bilaterocoenia
Billingsaria
Biphyllum
Bitraria
Blastosmilia
Blothrocyathus
Blothrophyllum
Blysmatophyllum
Bodeurina
Bodophyllum
Bogimbailites
Bojocyclus
Boolelasma
Bordenia
Borelasma
Bothroclisia
Bothrophoria
Bothrophyllum
Bouvierphyllum
Bowanophyllum
Bowenelasma
Brachiatusmilia
Brachycoenia
Brachycyathus
Brachymeandra
Brachyphyllia
Brachyseris
Bractea
Bracthelia
Bracytrochus
Bradyphyllum
Brevimaeandra
Breviphrentis
Breviphyllum
Breviseptophyllum
Briantelasma
Briantia
Bucanophyllum
Budaia
Bulvankeriphyllum
Bussonastraea

C
Calameastolia
Calamophyllia
Calamophylliopsis
Calamoseris
Calceola
Caliapora
Calinastrea
Calmiussiphyllum
Calophylloides
Calophyllum
Calostylis
Calostylopsis
Campophyllum
Camptolithus
Camurophyllum
Canadiphyllum
Caninella
Caninia
Caninophyllum
Caninostrotion
Cannapora
Cantrillia
Capnophyllum
Carantophyllum
Carcicocaenia
Cardiaphyllum
Cardiastraea
Carinotachylasma
Carinowaagenophyllum
Carinthiaphyllum
Carlinastraea
Carniaphyllum
Carolastraea
Carruthersella
Caryophyllia
Caryosmilia
Cassianastraea
Catactotoechus
Caulastrea
Cavilasma
Ceciliaphyllum
Celechopora
Cenomanina
Centristella
Ceratocoenia
Ceratophyllia
Ceratophyllum
Ceratopsammia
Ceratothecia
Ceratotrochus
Cereiophyllia
Ceriaster
Ceriocysta
Cerioelasma
Cerioheterastraea
Ceriostella
Ceriphyllum
Ceristella
Chalcidophyllum
Changjianggouphyllum
Charactophyllum
Charisphyllum
Chavsakia
Cheilosmilia
Chevalieria
Chevalierismilia
Chia
Chielasma
Chihsiaphyllum
Chlamydophyllum
Choanoplasma
Chomatoseris
Chonaxis
Chondrocoenia
Chonophyllum
Chonostegites
Chostophyllum
Chuanbeiphyllum
Chusenophyllum
Cionodendron
Circophyllia
Circophyllum
Circumtextiphyllum
Cladangia
Cladionophyllum
Cladochonus
Cladocora
Cladophyllia
Cladophylliopsis
Cladopora
Clausastraea
Clausastraeopsis
Clavilasma
Claviphyllum
Cleistopora
Clinophyllum
Clisiophyllum
Clonosmilia
Coccophyllum
Coccoseris
Codonophyllum
Codonosmilia
Coelocoenia
Coelolasma
Coelomeandra
Coeloseris
Coelostylis
Coenangia
Coenaphrodia
Coenastraea
Coenites
Coenocyathus
Coleophyllum
Collignonastraea
Colpophyllia
Columactinastrea
Columastrea
Columellogyra
Columnaphyllia
Columnaria
Columnaxon
Columnocoenia
Columnogyra
Columnolasma
Columnoporella
Comanaphyllum
Combophyllum
Commutatophyllum
Commutia
Comophyllastraea
Comophyllia
Comophylliopsis
Comoseris
Complanophyllum
Complexastraea
Complexastraeopsis
Complexophyllum
Compressiphyllum
Confusastraea
Confusastraraea
Conicosmiliotrochus
Connectastrea
Conocyathus
Conophyllia
Conopoterium
Conosmilia
Conotrochus
Contortophyllum
Convexastraea
Copia
Corbariastraea
Cornwallatia
Coronocyathus
Corphalia
Corrugopora
Corwenia
Coryphyllia
Coscinaraea
Cosjuvia
Cosmiolithus
Craspedophyllia
Crassialveolites
Crassicyclus
Crassilasma
Crassistella
Crassophrentis
Crateniophyllum
Craterastraea
Craterophyllum
Crateroseris
Cravenia
Crenulipora
Crenulites
Crepidophyllia
Cricocyathus
Crista
Cronyphyllum
Cruciphyllum
Cryptangia
Cryptocoenia
Cryptolichenaria
Ctenactis
Cuctienophyllum
Cuifastraea
Cuifia
Culicia
Cumminsia
Cunnolites
Curtastrum
Cyanaphyllum
Cyathactis
Cyathaxonella
Cyathaxonia
Cyathelia
Cyathoceras
Cyathoclisia
Cyathocoenia
Cyathocylindrum
Cyathopaedium
Cyathophora
Cyathophyllia
Cyathophylliopsis
Cyathophylloides
Cyathophyllum
Cyathoseris
Cyathosmilia
Cyathotrochus
Cyclastraea
Cyclindrocyathus
Cyclobacia
Cycloflabellum
Cyclolites
Cyclolitopsis
Cyclomussa
Cyclophyllia
Cyclophyllopsis
Cycloseris
Cylindrophyllia
Cylindrophyllum
Cylindrosmilia
Cylindrostylus
Cylismilia
Cymatelasma
Cymatella
Cymosmilia
Cyphastraea
Cyrtocyathus
Cyrtophyllum
Cystelasma
Cysticonophyllum
Cystihalysites
Cystihexagonaria
Cystilophophyllum
Cystipaliphyllum
Cystiphorolites
Cystiphylloides
Cystiphyllum
Cystitrypanopora
Cystocantrilla
Cystodendropora
Cystolonsdaleia
Cystolyrielasma
Cystophrentis
Cyttaroplasma
Czarnockia

D
Dactylaraea
Dactylocoenia
Dactylosmilia
Dagmaraephyllum
Daljanolites
Dalmanophyllum
Dalnia
Darwasophyllum
Dasmia
Dasmiopsis
Dasmosmilia
Debnikiella
Decaheliocoenia
Decaphyllum
Defrancia
Deiracorallium
Deltocyathus
Denayphyllum
Dendracis
Dendraraea
Dendrocyathus
Dendrofavosites
Dendrogyra
Dendroholmia
Dendrophyllia
Dendrosmilia
Dendrostella
Dendrozoum
Densigrewingkia
Densiphrentis
Densiphyllum
Dentilasma
Depasophyllum
Derivatolites
Dermosastraea
Dermoseris
Dermosmilia
Dermosmiliopsis
Dermosmiliopsis
Desmocladia
Desmocoenia
Desmophyllum
Dialeptophyllum
Dialytophyllum
Diaschophyllum
Diblasus
Dibunophyllum
Dichocaeniopsis
Dichocoenia
Dichophyllia
Dichotomosmilia
Dictyaraea
Dictyofavosites
Dictyopora
Diegosmilia
Diffingia
Diffusolasma
Digitosmilia
Digonoclisia
Digonophyllum
Dillerium
Dimelasma
Dimorpharaea
Dimorphastraeopsis
Dimorphastrea
Dimorphocoenia
Dimorphocoeniopsis
Dimorphofungia
Dimorphomeandra
Dimorphophyllia
Dimorphoseris
Dimorphosmilia
Dinophyllum
Dinostrophinx
Diorychopora
Diphyphyllum
Diplaraea
Diploastrea
Diplochone
Diplocoenia
Diplocteniopsis
Diploctenium
Diploepora
Diplogyra
Diplohelia
Diplophyllum
Diploria
Diplothecangia
Dipterophyllum
Disaraea
Discocoenia
Discocoeniopsis
Discocyathus
Discoidocyathus
Discosmilia
Discotrochus
Disphyllia
Disphyllum
Distichoflabellum
Distichomeandra
Distichophyllia
Ditoecholasma
Diversiphyllum
Dohmophyllum
Dokophyllum
Dominicotrochus
Donacophyllum
Donacosmilia
Donetzites
Donophyllum
Dordonophyllia
Dorlodotia
Drewerelasma
Dubrovia
Ducdonia
Duncanella
Duncania
Duncanopora
Duncanopsammia
Duncanosmilia
Dungulia
Duplocarinia
Duplophyllum
Durhamina
Dushanophrentis
Dybowskinia

E

Eastonastraea
Eastonoides
Ebocotrochus
Ebrayia
Eburneotrochus
Echigophyllum
Echinophyllia
Echinopora
Echyropora
Eckastraea
Edaphophyllum
Edwardsastraea
Edwardsomeandra
Edwardsoseris
Edwardsosmilia
Edwardsotrochus
Egosiella
Ekvasophyllum
Elasmocoenia
Elasmofungia
Elasmogyra
Elasmophora
Elasmophyllia
Elasmophyllum
Elephantaria
Ellesmerelasma
Ellipsasteria
Ellipsocoenia
Ellipsocyathus
Ellipsoidastraea
Ellipsosmilia
Elliptoseris
Elysastraea
Embolophyllum
Emmonsia
Emmonsiella
Empodesma
Enallhelia
Enallocoenia
Enallophrentis
Enallopsammia
Endamplexus
Endopachys
Endophyllum
Endothecium
Enigmalites
Entelophyllia
Entelophyllum
Enterolasma
Enygmophyllum
Eocatenipora
Eofletcheria
Eofletcheriella
Eoglossophyllum
Eohydnophora
Eolaminoplasma
Eostrotion
Epiphanophyllum
Epiphyllum
Epismilia
Epismiliopsis
Epistreptophyllum
Epitrochus
Ericina
Eridophyllum
Erlangbapora
Esthonia
Estonielasma
Etallonasteria
Eugyra
Eugyriopsis
Euhelia
Euphyllia
Eupsammia
Euryphyllum
Eusmilia
Eusmiliopsis
Eusthenotrochus
Evenkiella
Ewaldocoenia
Exilifrons
Exostega

F
Faberolasma
Faberophyllum
Fainella
Faksephyllia
Falsicatenipora
Famaxonia
Famennelasma
Farabophyllum
Fasciatiphyllia
Fasciculiamplexus
Fasciculophyllum
Fasciphyllum
Fasciseris
Favia
Favistina
Favites
Favitopsis
Faxsephyllia
Fedorowskicyathus
Fedorowskiella
Felixaraea
Felixastraea
Felixigyra
Ferrya
Ficariastraea
Flabellosmilia
Flabellum
Flagellophyllum
Fletcheria
Fletcheriella
Fletcherina
Flindersipora
Floria
Foerstephyllum
Fomichevia
Fomichivella
Fossaphyllia
Fossopora
Fossoporella
Frechastrea
Frescocyathus
Friedbergia
Fromentellia
Fromentelligyra
Fromeophyllum
Fruehwirthia
Fuchungopora
Fungia
Fungiacyathus
Fungiastraea
Funginella
Funginellastrea
Fungophyllia

G
Gablonzeria
Galaxea
Gallitellia
Gangamophyllum
Gaofengophyllum
Gardineroseris
Gaynaphyllum
Gazimuria
Genabacia
Gerthia
Gertholites
Geyeronaotia
Geyerophyllum
Ghirobocyathus
Gigantostylis
Gillastraea
Gissarophyllum
Glenaraea
Glossophyllum
Goldfussastrea
Gombertiphyllia
Goniastrea
Goniocora
Goniophyllum
Goniopora
Gonioseris
Gorizdronia
Gorskyella
Gorskyites
Gosaviaraea
Grabauphyllum
Gracilopora
Grandalveolites
Grandifavia
Granulidictyum
Granulina
Gravieropsamma
Gregorycoenia
Grewgiphyllum
Grewingkia
Groenlandophyllum
Groessensia
Grumiphyllia
Grypophyllum
Gshelia
Guanziyaopora
Gubbera
Guembelastraea
Guerichiphyllum
Guizhoustriatopora
Gundarina
Gurieuskiella
Guynia
Gyalophyllum
Gyaloplasma
Gymnophyllum
Gyrodendron

H
Hadrophyllum
Haimeicyclus
Haimesastraea
Haimesiphyllia
Hallia
Halomitra
Halysitastraea
Halysites
Hamarilopora
Hankaxis
Haplaraera
Haplohelia
Haplolasma
Haplothecia
Hapsiphyllum
Hapsizaphrentis
Haptaphyllina
Haptophyllum
Hattonia
Hayasakaia
Hebukophyllum
Hedeliastraea
Hedstroemophyllum
Heintzella
Helenolites
Helicelasma
Heliocïenia
Heliofungia
Heliolites
Heliophyllum
Helioplasma
Helioplasmolites
Helioseris
Heliostylina
Helladophyllia
Helloceras
Helminthidium
Hemiaulacophyllum
Hemicosmophyllum
Hemiplasmopora
Hemiporites
Hercophyllum
Heritschiella
Heritschioides
Herpolitha
Heterastraea
Heterocaninia
Heterocoenia
Heterocoenites
Heterocyathus
Heterogyra
Heterolasma
Heterophaulactis
Heterophrentis
Heterophyllia
Heterophylloides
Heteropsammia
Heterospongophyllum
Hexagonaria
Hexaheliocïenia
Hexalasma
Hexapetalum
Hexaphyllia
Hexismia
Hezhangophyllum
Hezhouphyllum
Hillaepora
Hillaxon
Hillophyllum
Hindeastraeá
Hinganastraea
Hiroshimaphyllum
Hispaniastraea
Holacanthopora
Holcotrochus
Holmophyllum
Holocùsôió
Holophragma
Homalophyllites
Homalophyllum
Homophyllia
Honggulosma
Hornsundia
Houershanophyllum
Huananaxonia
Huangia
Huanglongophyllum
Huangophyllum
Huayunophyllum
Hunanophrentis
Hydnophora
Hydnophorabacia
Hydnophorareá
Hydnophoromeandraraea
Hydnophoroseris
Hydnophyllon
Hydnoseris
Hydrocsaspedota
Hykeliphyllum
Hyostragulum

I
Ibukiphyllum
Icaunhelia
Idiophyllum
Idiotrochus
Ilariosmilia
Immenovia
Implicophyllum
Indiophyllum
Indophyllia
Indosmilia
Innapora
Insoliphyllum
Intersmilia
Iowaphyllum
Ipsiphyllum
Iranophyllum
Ironella
Isástraea
Isastrocoenia
Isïphyllastrea
Isophyllia
Issolites
Ivanovia
Ivdelephyllum
Ixogyra

J
Jiangshanolites
Jintingophyllum
Jipaolasma

K
Kabakovitchiella
Kakisaphyllum
Kaljolasma
Kángilacùathus
Karagemia
Káratchasôraea
Katranophyllum
Kazachiphyllum
Keimanelasma
Kenelasma
Kenophyllum
Kepingophyllum
Kerforneidictyum
Keriophyllia
Keriophylloides
Ketophylloides
Ketophyllum
Keyserlingophyllum
Khangailites
Khmeria
Kiaerites
Kiaerolites
Kielcephyllum
Kilbuchophyllum
Kimilites
Kinkaidia
Kionelasma
Kionophyllum
Kionotrochus
Kitakamilia
Kitakamiphyllum
Kizilia
Klaamannipora
Klamathastrea
Kleopatrina
Kobeha
Kobyastraea
Kobycoenia
Kodonophyllum
Koilocoenia
Koilotrochus
Kologyra
Kolymopora
Kompsasteria
Koninckocarina
Koninckophylloides
Koninckophyllum
Kowalaephyllum
Kozlowskinia
Kozlowskiocystia
Ksiazkiewiczia
Kuangxiastraea
Kueichouphyllum
Kueichowpora
Kuhnastraea
Kullmannophyllum
Kumbiopsammia
Kumpanophyllum
Kungejophyllum
Kunthia
Kusbassophyllum
Kwangsiphyllum
Kyphophyllum
Kysylagathophyllum

L
Labyrinthites
Laccophyllum
Laceripora
Lambelasma
Lambeophyllum
Lamellaeoporella
Lamellastraea
Lamellofungia
Lamellomeandra
Lamellophyllia
Laminocyathus
Lamottia
Langenhemia
Lasmosmilia
Laterophyllia
Latiastrea
Latiphyllia
Latomeandra
Latusastrea
Lecfedites
Leiopathes
Lekanophyllum
Leolasma
Leonardophyllum
Lepiconus
Lepidophyllia
Lepidophylliopsis
Leptastrea
Leptelasma
Leptocyathus
Leptomussa
Leptophyllaraea
Leptophyllastraea
Leptophyllia
Leptophyllon
Leptoria
Leptoseris
Lesliella
Lessnikovaea
Leurelasma
Levicyathus
Liangshanophyllum
Liardiphyllum
Liauria
Lichenaria
Lindstroemia
Lindstroemophyllum
Liptodendron
Liscombea
Litharaeopsis
Lithophyllon
Lithostrotion
Lithostrotionella
Lithostrozionoides
Lithotrotionoides
Litvolasma
Lobocorallium
Lobophyllia
Lobopsammia
Loboseris
Lochmaeosmilia
Longiclava
Longlinophyllia
Lonsdaleia
Lonsdaleiastraea
Lonsdaleoides
Loomberaphyllum
Lophamplexus
Lophelia
Lophocarinophyllum
Lopholasma
Lophophrentis
Lophophyllia
Lophophyllidium
Lophophyllum
Lophosmilia
Lophotichium
Loyolophyllum
Lublinophyllum
Lubowastraea
Lupitschia
Lyliophyllum
Lyopora
Lyrielasma
Lythophyllum
Lytvolasma
Lytvophyllum

M

Macgeea
Macgeopsis
Mackenzia
Mackenziephyllum
Madracis
Madrepora
Maeandramorpha
Maendroseris
Maendrostylis
Maikottaphyllum
Maikottia
Majiaobaphyllum
Manicina
Manipora
Mansuyphyllum
Margarastraea
Margarastreopsis
Margarophyllia
Margarosmilia
Marisastrum
Mariusilites
Martinophyllum
Mastopora
Matejkia
Maurenia
Mazaphyllum
Mcleodea
Meandraraea
Meandrastrea
Meandrina
Meandrophyllia
Meandroria
Meandrosmilia
Meandrostylis
Meandrovoltzeia
Mecloudius
Medinophyllum
Medusaephyllum
Meitanopora
Melanophyllidium
Melanophyllum
Melikerona
Melrosia
Meniscophyllum
Menophyllum
Merlewoodia
Merulina
Mesofavosites
Mesolites
Mesomorpha
Mesophyllum
Mesosolenia
Mesouralina
Metrionaxon
Metriophyllum
Metrioplexus
Michelinaraea
Michelottiphyllia
Micrabacia
Microcyathus
Microcyclus
Microphyllia
Microphylliopsis
Microplasma
Microsmilia
Microsolena
Microsolenastraea
Mictocystis
Mictophyllum
Micula
Miculiella
Migmatophyllum
Mikkwaphyllum
Minatoa
Minatolites
Minussiella
Miophora
Mioscapophyllia
Mioseris
Miroelasma
Miscellosmilia
Misistella
Mitrodendron
Mixastraea
Mixogonaria
Miyakosimilia
Mochlophyllum
Modesta
Molophyllum
Molukkia
Mongoliolites
Monocyclastraea
Monomyces
Monsteraphyllum
Montastraea
Monticuliphyllia
Monticyathus
Montipora
Montlivaltia
Moorowipora
Moravophyllum
Morchellastraea
Morphastrea
Morycastraea
Mucophyllum
Multicarinophyllum
Multicolumnastraea
Multisolenia
Multithecopora
Murphyphyllum
Mussa
Mussisíilia
Mycedium
Mycetaraea
Mycetophyllia
Mycetophylliopsis
Mycetoseries
Myriophyllia
Myriophyllum

N
Nadotia
Nagatophyllum
Nalivkinella
Nanshanophyllum
Naoides
Naos
Nataliella
Natalophyllum
Navoites
Neaxon
Neaxonella
Neepaliphyllum
Nefocoenia
Nefophyllia
Nemistium
Neoaspongophyllum
Neobrachyelasma
Neocaeniopsis
Neocantrilla
Neoclissiophyllum
Neocoenia
Neocolumnaria
Neoconophyllia
Neocystiphyllum
Neofletcheriella
Neokeyserlingophyllum
Neokoninckophyllum
Neokyphophyllum
Neomphyma
Neomultithecopora
Neopaliphyllum
Neopetrozium
Neoroemeria
Neospongophylloides
Neostringophylloides
Neosyringopora
Neotabularia
Neotemnophyllum
Neotryplasma
Neovepresiphyllum
Neowormsipora
Neozaphrentis
Nephelophyllum
Nerthastraea
Nervophyllum
Nevadaphyllum
Niajuphyllum
Nicaeotrochus
Nicholsoniella
Ninghuaphyllum
Ningnanophyllum
Ningqiangolites
Ningquiangophyllum
Nipponophyllum
Nitkovicepora
Nodophyllum
Nordastrea
Nothaphrophyllum
Nothophyllum
Notocyathus
Notophyllia
Novichuskia
Numidiaphyllum
Nyctopora

O
Octoheliocoenia
Oculina
Oculinella
Oculipora
Odontocyathoides
Odontocyathus
Odontophyllum
Oedalmia
Ogilviastraea
Ogilvilasma
Ogilvinella
Oharaia
Ohnopora
Oligophylloides
Oligophyllum
Oliveria
Omiphyllum
Omphalophyllia
Omphalophylliopsis
Onchotrochus
Ondadiplocteniopsis
Onychophyllum
Opiphyllum
Oppelisíilia
Orbignycoenia
Orbignygyra
Orionastraea
Ornatophyllum
Orthocyathus
Ortholites
Orthophyllum
Orygmophyllum
Oulangia
Oulastrea
Oulophyllia
Ovalastraeopsis
Ovalastrea
Oyonnaxastraea
Ozakiphyllum
Ozopora

P
Paãhythecalis
Pachycoenia
Pachycyathus
Pachydendron
Pachyfavosites
Pachygyra
Pachyhelioplasma
Pachylites
Pachyphragma
Pachyphyllia
Pachypora
Pachyseris
Pachysolenia
Pachystelliporella
Pachystriatopora
Paeckelmannopora
Palaeacis
Palaearaea
Palaeastraea
Palaeastraea
Palaeocorolites
Palaeocyathus
Palaeocyclus
Palaeoentelophyllum
Palaeofavosipora
Palaeohelia
Palaeolithostrotion
Palaeomussa
Palaeophyllia
Palaeophyllum
Palaeoplesiastraea
Palaeoporites
Palaeopsammia
Palaeosmilia
Palaeosmilia
Palastraea
Palastreopora
Paleoalvolites
Paleoastroides
Paleogrypophyllum
Paliphyllum
Palocyathus
Pamirophyllum
Pamiroseris
Pantophyllum
Papiliophyllum
Paraaulina
Parabrachyellasma
Paracannia
Paracarruthersella
Paraclausastraea
Paracolumnaria
Paracunnolites
Paracyathus
Paracycloseries
Paracystiphylloides
Paradeltocyathus
Paradisphyllum
Paradistichophyllum
Paradoxaphyllia
Paraduplophyllum
Parafletcharia
Parahalomitra
Paraheritschioides
Paraipciphyllum
Paralithostrotion
Paralleynia
Paramichelina
Paramixogonaria
Paramplexoides
Parapavona
Paraphyllogyra
Paraplacocoenia
Parapleurosmélia
Pararachnastraea
Pararachnastraea
Parasarcinula
Parasiphonophyllia
Parasmilia
Parasmithiphyllum
Parasociophyllum
Parasôraeopora
Parastauria
Parastelliporella
Parasterophrentis
Parastraeoíorpha
Parastriatopora
Parastriatoporella
Parasynastraea
Paratetradium
Parathecosmilia
Parathysanophyllum
Parawentzelella
Parawentzellophyllum
Parazolophyllia
Parazonophyllum
Parepisoilia
Paretallonia
Pareynia
Parisastraea
Paronastrara
Parvaxon
Paterophyllum
Pattalophyllia
Pattalophylliopsis
Pavastehphyllum
Pavona
Pectinia
Pedderelasma
Peneckiella
Pentacoenia
Pentamplexus
Pentaphyllia
Pentaphyllum
Peplosmilia
Peponocyathus
Peripaedium
Periphacelopora
Periseris
Peronophyllum
Petalaxis
Petraia
Petraiella
Petraphyllum
Petridictyum
Petronella
Petrophylliella
Petrozium
Pexiphyllum
Phacelepismilia
Phacellastraea
Phacellocoenia
Phacellophyllum
Phacelloplasma
Phacelophyllia
Phacelostylophyllum
Phaulactis
Phillipsastrea
Phineus
Phyllangia
Phyllocoenia
Phyllogyra
Phyllohelia
Phylloseriopsis
Phylloseris
Phyllosmilia
Phymatophyllum
Physogyra
Physoseris
Phytogyra
Phytopsis
Piceaphyllum
Pilophyllia
Pilophylloides
Pinacophyllum
Pindosmilia
Pironastrea
Placocoenia
Placocoeniopsis
Placocyathus
Placogyra
Placogyropsis
Placophora
Placophyllia
Placosmilia
Placotrochus
Planalveolitella
Planalveolites
Planetophyllum
Planocoenites
Plasmadictyon
Plasmophyllum
Plasmoporella
Platyaxum
Platycoenia
Platycyathus
Platygyra
Platyhelia
Platytrochopsis
Platytrochus
Plavecia
Pleophyllum
Pleramplexus
Plerodiffia
Plesiastrea
Plesiocaryophyllia
Plesiocoenia
Plesiocunnolitopsis
Plesiodiplcteniopsis
Plesiodiploria
Plesiofavia
Plesiomontlivaltia
Plesiophyllia
Plesiophyllum
Plesiosiderastraea
Plesiostylina
Plesiothamnasteria
Pleurocora
Pleurophyllia
Pleurophyllum
Pleuropodia
Pleurosiphonella
Pleurostylina
Plexituba
Plicatomurus
Plocoastraea
Pocillopora
Podabacia
Podollites
Podoseris
Polaroplasma
Poliphyllum
Polyadelphia
Polyastropsis
Polydilasma
Polygonaria
Polymorphastraea
Polyphylloseris
Polyrophe
Polyseries
Polystylidium
Polythecalis
Polythecalloides
Porfirieviella
Porites
Pourtalocyathus
Praewentzelella
Pragnellia
Primitophyllum
Priscosolenia
Prismatophyllum
Pristiophyllia
Proaplophyllia
Procladocora
Procteria
Procyathopora
Procyclolites
Prodarwinia
Prodonacosmilia
Progyrosmilia
Proheliolites
Prohexagonaria
Proleptophyllia
Propora
Proporella
Prosmilia
Proterophyllum
Protethmos
Protoaulacophyllum
Protocaninia
Protocarcinophyllum
Protocyathactis
Protocyathophyllum
Protodurhamina
Protoheliolites
Protoheterastrea
Protolonsdaleiastraea
Protomacgeea
Protomichelinia
Protopilophyllum
Protopora
Protoramulophyllum
Protoseris
Prototryplasma
Protowentzellia
Protozaphrentis
Protrachypora
Protrochiscolithus
Protrochocyathus
Provinciastraea
Pruvostastraea
Psammiophora
Psammocora
Psammocyathus
Psammogyra
Psammohelia
Pseudallotropiophyllum
Pseudamplexophyllum
Pseudamplexus
Pseudisastraea
Pseudoamplexus
Pseudoamygdalophyllum
Pseudoblothrophyllum
Pseudobradyphyllum
Pseudocampophyllum
Pseudochonophyllum
Pseudoclaviphyllum
Pseudocoenia
Pseudocoeniopsis
Pseudocryptophyllum
Pseudocycloseris
Pseudocystiphyllum
Pseudodigonophyllum
Pseudodiplocoenia
Pseudodorlodotia
Pseudofavia
Pseudofavites
Pseudofavosites
Pseudoflecteria
Pseudogatheria
Pseudogrypophyllum
Pseudoheliastraea
Pseudohexagonaria
Pseudohuangia
Pseudoironealla
Pseudomicrocroplasma
Pseudomucophyllum
Pseudomyriophyllia
Pseudopavona
Pseudopetraia
Pseudophaulactis
Pseudopilophyllum
Pseudopisthophyllum
Pseudopolythecalis
Pseudorhabdophyllum
Pseudoroemeria
Pseudoroemeripora
Pseudoromingeria
Pseudoseris
Pseudosiderastraea
Pseudotimania
Pseudotryplasma
Pseudowannerophyllum
Pseudoyatsengia
Pseudozaphrentoides
Psydracophyllum
Pterophrentis
Ptychophyllum
Puanophyllum
Puchastraea
Pycnactis
Pycnactoides
Pycnolithus
Pycnostylus
Pyramisasteria

Q
Qianbeilites
Qiannanophyllum
Qinghaiphyllum
Qinlingophyllum
Quadratiphyllia
Quenstedtiphyllia
Quepora

R
Rabdastrea
Rachaniephyllum
Radiastrea
Radiciphyllia
Radiophyllum
Ramiphyllum
Ramulophyllum
Recticostastraea
Rectigrewingkia
Redstonea
Reimanelasma
Reimaniphyllia
Reimanophyllum
Reisocyathus
Remesia
Remismilia
Renirsmilia
Rennensismilia
Retiophyllia
Retiophyllum
Reuschia
Reussangia
Reussicoenia
Reussiphyllia
Reussiphyllon
Reussopsammia
Rhabdelasma
Rhabdocora
Rhabdocyclus
Rhabdofavia
Rhabdophyllia
Rhabdophylliopsis
Rhabdotetradium
Rhacopora
Rhaetiastraea
Rhapidophyllum
Rhegmaphyllum
Rhipidogyra
Rhipidophyllum
Rhipidosmilia
Rhizangia
Rhizophylloides
Rhizophyllum
Rhopalophyllia
Rhytidolasma
Rhytidophyllum
Ridderia
Riphaeolites
Rodinosmilia
Roemeria
Roemeripora
Roemerolites
Romingeria
Rossopora
Rotiphyllum
Rozkowskaella
Rozkowskia
Rudakites
Rukhinia
Ryderophyllum
Rylstonia

S
Saaremolites
Saeptiphyllia
Saffordophyllum
Sagittastraea
Sakalavastraea
Sakalavastraeopsis
Sakalavicyathus
Salairia
Salairophyllum
Saleelasma
Salpingium
Saltastraea
Salvadorea
Sandalolitha
Sanidophyllum
Sapporipora
Sarcinula
Sassendalia
Saucrophyllum
Scalariogyra
Scenophyllum
Scharkovaelites
Schindewolfia
Schizophaulactis
Schizophorites
Schizosmilia
Schizosmiliopsis
Schlotheimophyllum
Schlueteriphylum
Schmidtilites
Schoenophyllum
Schreteria
Sciophyllum
Sclerophyllum
Sclerosmilia
Sclydolithus
Scoliopora
Scolymia
Scruttonia
Scyphophyllum
Segdianophyllum
Selenegyra
Sematetheos
Semeloseris
Semidistichophyllum
Septastrea
Septentrionites
Seriastraea
Seriatopora
Sestrophyllum
Shansiphyllum
Shanxipora
Shastaphyllum
Shensiphyllum
Sibiriolitella
Sibiriolites
Siderastrea
Siderocoenia
Siderofungia
Sideroseris
Siderosmilia
Siedleckia
Sigelophyllum
Sïlenocoenia
Silesiastraea
Siliningastraea
Sinaimeandra
Sinasteria
Siniastraea
Sinkiangopora
Sinochlamydeophyllum
Sinodisphyllum
Sinopora
Sinoporella
Sinuosiphyllia
Siphonodendron
Siphonolasma
Siphonophrentis
Siphonophyllia
Skolekophyllum
Skoliophyllum
Slimoniphyllum
Smiloôrochus
Smilostylia
Smithicyathus
Smithiphyllum
Smythina
Sochkineophyllum
Sociophyllum
Soetenia
Sogdianophyllum
Sokoloviella
Solenastrea
Solenihalysites
Solenodendron
Solipetra
Somphopora
Soshkinolites
Sparsisolenia
Spasskyella
Sphenotrochopsis
Sphenotrochus
Spineria
Spinophyllum
Spirapora
Spiroclados
Spirophyllum
Spissophyllum
Spongastraea
Spongielasma
Spongioalveolites
Spongonaria
Spongophylloides
Spongophyllum
Spumaeolites
Squameoalveolites
Squameofavosites
Squameolites
Squameophyllum
Squameopora
Stauria
Stauromatidium
Staurophyllum
Stelechophyllum
Stellatophyllum
Stelliporella
Stelloria
Stenocùathus
Stephanaria
Stephanasôrea
Stephanaxocoenia
Stephanaxophyllia
Stephanocoenia
Stephanocyathus
Stephanophyllia
Stephanosmilia
Stereocoenia
Stereocorypha
Stereodespasophyllum
Stereolasma
Stereophrentis
Stereophyllum
Stereopsammia
Stereostylus
Sterictophyllum
Stewartophyllum
Stibastrea
Stiboria
Stichopsammia
Stikineastraea
Stilbophyllum
Stortophyllum
Stratophyllum
Strephophyllum
Streptocyathopsis
Streptocyathus
Streptophyllum
Striatopora
Striatoporella
Stringophylloides
Stringophyllum
Strombodes
Strotogyra
Stuoresia
Stuoresimorpha
Stylangia
Stylastraea
Stylina
Stylocoenia
Stylocoeniella
Stylocora
Stylocyathus
Stylonites
Stylophora
Stylophyllopsis
Stylophyllum
Stylopleura
Stylopsammia
Stylosmilia
Stylotrochus
Subalveolitella
Subalveolites
Subcaliapora
Submesofavosites
Substuoresis
Subtilicyathus
Subutaratuia
Sudetia
Sugiyamaella
Sulcorphyllum
Summiktaraea
Sumsarophyllum
Sunophyllum
Sutherlandia
Sutherlandia
Svalbardphyllum
Sverigophyllum
Svetlania
Sychnoelasma
Symbiangia
Symphyllia
Symphyphyllum
Symplectophyllum
Synamplexoides
Synamplexus
Synaptophyllum
Synastraea
Synhelia
Syringaxon
Syringoalycon
Syringocolumna
Syringoheliolites
Syringolites
Syringopora
Syringoporella
Syringoporiella
Syringoporinus
Sytovaelites
Syzygophyllia
Szechuanophyllum

T
Tabellaephyllum
Tabularia
Tabulophyllum
Tachylasma
Tachyphyllum
Taeniolites
Taimyrophyllum
Taisyakuphyllum
Taiziheophyllum
Tanbaella
Taralasma
Tarbellastraea
Tarphyphyllum
Tarraconogyra
Taruphyllum
Tatjanophyllum
Tawuphyllum
Taxogyra
Tectamichelina
Teleiophyllia
Temnophyllum
Tenuilasma
Tenuiphyllum
Tethocyathus
Tetradium
Tetrafossularia
Tetralasma
Tetraporella
Tetraporinus
Texastrea
Texturiphyllum
Thamnasteria
Thamnasteriamorpha
Thamnastraea
Thamnophyllum
Thamnopora
Thamnoporella
Thamnoptychia
Thamnoseris
Thamnosmilia
Thamnotropis
Thaumatolites
Thecacristatus
Thecactinastraea
Thecaxon
Thecia
Thecipora
Thecocyathus
Thecomeandra
Thecoseriopsis
Thecoseris
Thecosmilia
Thecostegites
Thololasma
Thoulelasma
Thuliocyclus
Thuriantha
Thyryptophyllum
Thysanophyllum
Thysanus
Tiaradendron
Tiarasmilia
Timania
Timorphyllum
Tipheophyllum
Tjanshanophyllum
Toechastraea
Tollina
Tonkinaria
Toquimaphyllum
Tortoflabellum
Tortophyllum
Trabeculites
Trachylasma
Trachyphyllia
Trachyphyllum
Trachypsammia
Transitolites
Trapezophyllum
Traskina
Trechmannaria
Trematotrochus
Triadophyllum
Tricassastraea
Tricycloseris
Trigerastraea
Trigerastraeopsis
Trigonella
Triphyllia
Triplophyllum
Trocharea
Trochiscolithus
Trochocyathus
Trochoidomeandra
Trochophyllum
Trochoplegmopsis
Trochoseris
Trochosmilia
Troedssonites
Tropiastraea
Tropidendron
Tropidocyathus
Tropidophyllum
Tropiphyllum
Truncatocyathus
Truncatoflabellum
Truncicarinulum
Truncoconus
Trypacystiphyllum
Tryplasma
Tschussovskenia
Tskanorella
Tubicora
Tubinacis
Tumanophyllum
Tumsucophyllum
Turbinaria
Turbinatocanina
Turbinolia
Turbophyllum
Turgidiffia
Turnacipora
Tyrganolithes

U
Ufimia
Ulanophyllum
Ullernelasma
Undaria
Uralinia
Uralopora
Urceopora
Utaratuia

V
Vacoea
Vacuopora
Valliculastraea
Vallimeadra
Vallimeandropsis
Valliseris
Valloria
Variabilifavia
Variseptophyllum
Vaughania
Vaughanoseris
Vepresiphyllum
Vepresisociophyllum
Veraephyllum
Verbeekiella
Verolites
Verrillofungia
Vesiculophyllum
Vesiculotubus
Vestigiphyllum
Victorilites
Vielicyathus
Viminohelia
Visbylites
Vischeria
Vivesastraea
Vojnovskija
Volzeia

W
Waagenophyllum
Wadeopsammia
Wapitiphyllum
Weiningophyllum
Weissermelia
Wellsotrochus
Wenlockia
Wentzelella
Wentzelellites
Wentzelloides
Wentzelophyllum
Wenxianophyllum
Werneckelasma
Wexolina
Weyerelasma
Wilsonastraea
Windelasma
Wintunastraea
Wormsipora

X
Xenocyathellus
Xenoemmonsia
Xianguangia
Xiangzhouphyllum
Xiphelasma
Xystrigona
Xystriphylloides
Xystriphyllum

Y
Yabeiphyllum
Yacutiopora
Yakovliella
Yanbianophyllum
Yaoxianopora
Yassia
Yatsengia
Yavorskia
Yishanophyllum
Yohophyllum
Yokoyamaella
Yuanophylloides
Yuanophyllum
Yurievstiella

Z
Zakowia
Zaphrentis
Zaphrentites
Zaphrentoides
Zaphrentula
Zaphriphyllum
Zardinophyllum
Zeliaphyllum
Zelocystiphyllum
Zelolasma
Zelophyllia
Zelophyllum
Zenophilia
Zeravschania
Zhushanophyllum
Zittelofungia
Zonodigonophyllum
Zonophyllum

See also
List of prehistoric octocorals

References

Hexacorals
 List of